Ian Nesbit Brennan (born 17 July 1930) is a former New Zealand cricketer. He played in three first-class matches for Wellington in 1958–59.

A left-handed batsman, Brennan's highest first-class score was 40 in his last match, when he opened the batting and added 104 for the second wicket with Bob Vance in a Plunket Shield match against Otago. He played Hawke Cup cricket for Hutt Valley from 1948 to 1962 and was a member of the team that won the title in December 1948 and held it until April 1950.

See also
 List of Wellington representative cricketers

References

External links
 

1930 births
Living people
New Zealand cricketers
Wellington cricketers
People from Petone
Cricketers from Lower Hutt